Central Park Dark is a 2021 American thriller film written and directed by Cybil Lake and starring Lake and Tom Sizemore.

Premise
A doctor who is married after spending a night with a woman begins to have strange nightmares about her.

Cast
 Cybil Lake
 Tom Sizemore
 Margaret Reed
 Lily Peterson
 Al Nazemian

Release
The film was released on February 2, 2021.

Reception
Bobby LePire of Film Threat gave the film a 7 out of 10.

References

External links
 
 

2021 films
American thriller films
2021 thriller films
2020s English-language films
2020s American films